Ernest W. Spangler Stadium is a 9,000-seat multi-purpose stadium in Boiling Springs, North Carolina. It is home to the Gardner–Webb University Bulldogs football team.  The facility opened in 1969. Spangler Stadium underwent a $7 million overhaul in 2005 that included additions of a new Football Center that houses football coaches' offices, athletic weight facilities, president's box, press box, and other luxury boxes.

See also
 List of NCAA Division I FCS football stadiums

References

External links
Spangler Stadium

Athletics (track and field) venues in North Carolina
College football venues
Sports venues in North Carolina
Buildings and structures in Cleveland County, North Carolina
Multi-purpose stadiums in the United States
Gardner–Webb University
1969 establishments in North Carolina
Sports venues completed in 1969
American football venues in North Carolina
College track and field venues in the United States